Elvira Cabbarova (born 15 November 1976) is an Azerbaijani sprinter. She competed in the women's 100 metres at the 1996 Summer Olympics.

References

External links
 

1976 births
Living people
Athletes (track and field) at the 1996 Summer Olympics
Azerbaijani female sprinters
Olympic athletes of Azerbaijan
Place of birth missing (living people)
Olympic female sprinters
20th-century Azerbaijani women